Gallieni (Parc de Bagnolet) is a station on Paris Métro Line 3, being its eastern terminus. It is next door to a large international bus station serving bus services from Eurolines.

Location
The station is located under the Paris-Gallieni International Bus Station, in the heart of a motorway complex at the junction of the A3 autoroute and the Boulevard Périphérique Paris ring-road. Oriented along an east–west axis, it is preceded by or followed by the Porte de Bagnolet metro station.

History
It was opened on 2 April 1971 when the line was extended from Gambetta in order to improve the service to the town of Bagnolet. It has since been the new eastern terminus, replacing the previous terminus at Porte des Lilas, the section between the latter and Gambetta station, disconnected since 27 March 1971 and became the current line 3 bis. It is situated on the Avenue Gallieni, which is named after General Joseph Gallieni, famous for commandeering 600 taxis to take troops to the front to help save Paris during the First Battle of the Marne in 1914.

The station bears the subtitle Parc de Bagnolet because of its proximity to the northwest end of Parc Jean-Moulin-Les Guilands, shared between the municipalities of Bagnolet and Montreuil.

In the course of the 2010s, the tiling on the walls supporting the station's ceiling was renovated, changing from beige to the characteristic white of the metro network, the upper part was left bare and painted white.

In 2018, 5,841,623 passengers entered this station, which places it at the 70th position of the metro stations for its usage.

Passenger services

Access
The station has two entrances:
 entrance 1 - Shopping Center, consisting of a fixed staircase decorated with a mast with a yellow M inscribed in a circle, emerging under two road ramps connecting the Boulevard Périphérique to the A3 autoroute, to the right of the Bel Est commercial center;
 entrance 2 RATP Bus Station, consisting of a fixed staircase lined with an escalator allowing only the exit, located slightly further south, opposite the said bus station. Although the station was built in the 1970s, the sides of the exchange room are covered with traditional bevelled white tiles.

Station layout

Platforms
Gallieni is a station of a particular configuration. It has four tracks framing two island platforms. The trains arrive on the central tracks and depart from the central north and north side tracks, the south side track used for the train depot. The walls are vertical, as are the pillars, and support a horizontal ceiling covered with a black fire-resistant flocking. The decoration is typical of the 1970s: the bevelled ceramic tiles, placed vertically and aligned, are beige in colour on the walls (a colour that can be found at Porte de Bagnolet on the same line and at Kléber on line 6) and white on the pillars, the upper part of the latter being coated and painted white. The advertising frames are metallic and the name of the station, inscribed on enamelled plates, is in Helvetica font instead of the usual Parisine typography, a peculiarity that the station only shares with Place d'Italie on line 6 and Porte de Versailles on line 12. The Motte style seats are yellow.

Bus connections
The station has a bus station served by the RATP Bus Network, lines 76, 102, 122, 221, 318 and 351.

The station is in direct contact with the Paris-Gallieni International Bus Station through a connecting corridor.

Nearby
 Bel Est shopping center
 Paris-Gallieni International Bus Station
 Parc de Bagnolet (parc départemental Jean-Moulin - Les Guilands)
 Centre d'affaires Gallieni 2
 Les Mercuriales

References

Paris Métro stations in Bagnolet
Railway stations in France opened in 1971